Park In-chon (Korean:박인천, hanja:朴仁天, July 5, 1901 - June 16, 1984) was a South Korean businessman. He was the founder and first head of the Kumho Asiana Group, Kumho Asiana Transportation Group and the Korean Synthetic Rubbers company.

1st child : Park Seong-yong February 17, 1932, died May 23, 2005
2nd child : Park Kyung-Ae 1934
3rd child : Park Jeong-Koo born: 10 August 1937 (85 years old if alive), died 13 July 2002 (65 years old) Male.
4th child : Park Gang-Ja 1941
5th child: Park Sam-koo born: March 19, 1945 (77 years old), Gwangju is the biggest shareholder, has a daughter named Park Se Jin 1978 (44 years)
6th child: Park Chan-koo August 13, 1948
7th child: Park Hyun-Ju March 7, 1953

References 

 
 
 

Kumho Asiana Group
20th-century South Korean businesspeople
1901 births
1984 deaths